Szolnoki MÁV FC is a Hungarian football club, from the city of Szolnok. In 2010 it gained promotion to the National Championship.

Crest and colours 
The colours of the club are  blue and  white.

Manufacturers and shirt sponsors
The following table shows in detail Szolnoki MÁV FC kit manufacturers and shirt sponsors by year:

Current squad 
''As of 14 February 2022.

Out on loan

Honours
Hungarian Cup:
 Winners (1) :1940–41

Manager history

  Károly Kis (Dec 11, 2012 – Oct 26, 2015)
  József Csábi (Oct 26, 2015–)

External links
Official website

 
Association football clubs established in 1910
Football clubs in Hungary
1910 establishments in Hungary